Hallfreðr Óttarsson or Hallfreðr vandræðaskáld (Troublesome Poet) (c. 965 – c. 1007) was an Icelandic skald. He is the protagonist of Hallfreðar saga according to which he was the court poet first of Hákon Sigurðarson, then of Óláfr Tryggvason and finally of Eiríkr Hákonarson. A significant amount of poetry by Hallfreðr has been preserved, primarily in Hallfreðar saga and the kings' sagas but a few fragments are also quoted in Skáldskaparmál.

In his lausavísur Hallfreðr was an unusually personal skald, offering insight into his emotional life and, especially, his troubled and reluctant conversion from paganism to Christianity under the tutelage of king Óláfr. The following is an example.

The Bergsbók manuscript attributes an Óláfsdrápa Tryggvasonar to Hallfreðr, but this attribution is rejected by modern scholars.

External links
 page at the Skaldic Project
Hallfreðr vandræðaskáld All extant poetry
Hallfreðar saga vandræðaskálds in the Möðruvallabók version
Myth and Religion in the Poetry of a Reluctant Convert Article by Diana Whaley
Erfidrápa Óláfs Tryggvasonar Text of Erfidrápa with short notes on the poet in Norwegian

10th-century Icelandic poets
960s births
1000s deaths
Year of birth uncertain
Year of death uncertain
11th-century Icelandic poets
Icelandic male poets
Converts to Christianity from pagan religions